Rhenzy Feliz (born October 26, 1997) is an American actor and occasional singer, who is best known for playing the role of Camilo Madrigal in Disney's 2021 computer-animated feature film Encanto and Alex Wilder in the Hulu/Marvel original series Runaways.

Life and career
Feliz was born in the Bronx to a 21-year-old single mother. He is of Dominican descent. His mother moved him to Florida, where he reportedly attended eight different schools while still in elementary school. "[W]e moved to Florida because she hated the cold and didn't want me to grow up in an environment like that. We didn't end up in an amazing place in Florida, but it was better than the Bronx in New York at that time... And because of her, I had a very good childhood." After his mother remarried, they moved to Los Angeles and he attended Santa Monica High School where he majored in Drama due to gaining an interest in it. He and his team were finalists in the 2016 August Wilson Monologue Competition and The Music Center's Spotlight Program where he gained recognition.

Feliz performed a monologue from the play Two Trains Running.

In 2017, Feliz landed the role of Alex Wilder in Marvel's Runaways. He made a guest appearance on Kevin (Probably) Saves the World as Marc, "a young man who has left home in search of adventure".

In 2018, Feliz dated actress Isabella Gomez.

In 2021, Feliz voiced the character of Camilo Madrigal in Disney's computer-animated feature film Encanto.

In 2023, Feliz was cast in The Batman spin-off The Penguin for HBO Max starring Colin Farrell.

Filmography

Film

Television

Discography

Charted songs

References

External links

1997 births
Living people
21st-century American male actors
Hispanic and Latino American male actors
American people of Dominican Republic descent